The Enterprise–Ozark Micropolitan Statistical Area, as defined by the United States Census Bureau, was an area consisting of two counties in southeastern Alabama, anchored by the cities of Enterprise and Ozark. As of the 2000 census, the μSA had a population of 92,744 (though a July 1, 2009 estimate placed the population at 96,782).

The Enterprise–Ozark Micropolitan Statistical Area was part of the Dothan–Enterprise–Ozark Combined Statistical Area.

In 2013, the Enterprise–Ozark Micropolitan Statistical Area was split into two micropolitan areas, to let both Enterprise and Ozark have their own, independent micropolitan areas.

Counties
Coffee - reassigned as Enterprise Micropolitan Area in 2013.
Dale - reassigned as Ozark Micropolitan Area in 2013.

Communities

Places with more than 20,000 inhabitants
Enterprise (Principal city)
Dothan (partial)

Places with 10,000 to 20,000 inhabitants
Ozark (Principal city)

Places with 1,000 to 10,000 inhabitants
Daleville
Elba
Fort Rucker (census-designated place)
Level Plains
Midland City
New Brockton
Newton

Places with less than 1,000 inhabitants
Ariton
Clayhatchee
Grimes
Kinston
Napier Field
Pinckard

Demographics
As of the census of 2000, there were 92,744 people, 36,299 households, and 26,119  families residing within the μSA. The racial makeup of the μSA was 75.66% White, 19.42% African American, 0.75% Native American, 1.02% Asian, 0.12% Pacific Islander, 1.10% from other races, and 1.92% from two or more races. Hispanic or Latino of any race were 3.05% of the population.

The median income for a household in the μSA was $32,831, and the median income for a family was $38,735. Males had a median income of $30,656 versus $20,111 for females. The per capita income for the μSA was $17,166.

See also
Alabama census statistical areas

References

 
Geography of Dale County, Alabama
Geography of Coffee County, Alabama
Micropolitan areas of Alabama